Ruslan Belemkhanovich Duzmambetov (born 21 April 1968) is a Kazakhstani football referee and a former player.

Career statistics

Club

International

International goals

References

1968 births
Living people
Kazakhstani footballers
Kazakhstani football referees
Association football forwards
Kazakhstan international footballers